Corydalis malkensis is a species of flowering plant in the poppy family Papaveraceae, native to the Caucasus. It is a spring ephemeral whose foliage dies down in the summer. 

Suitable for cultivation in a rock garden or alpine house, it requires sharp drainage in a sunny or partially shaded location which is dry in summer and damp in the winter. It has gained the Royal Horticultural Society's Award of Garden Merit.

References
 

malkensis
Flora of the Caucasus